Paranur is a village in India near the busy GST Road or National Highway 45. It has a railway station and few hundred houses, and is 44 km from Chennai International Airport in Tirusulam. Paranur comes under Panchayat union/block of Kattankulathur, and Panchayat Raj under Veerapuram. Paranur has been declared a special economic zone (SEZ) since October 2005; companies like Infosys and BMW have started units in this village.

About the Railway Station
The Paranur railway station is the first of its kind in the public-private partnership between a private company and the Indian Railways. Benefitting this trendsetting venture, Shilpa Architects has incorporated several design elements that capture global best practices in amenities for rail passengers from other countries where high volume of passenger traffic combines efficiency and passenger comfort.

References

External links
 http://www.elcot.com/mipl.htm
 Shilpa Architects
 Shilpa Architects: Paranur Railway Station 
 https://bharatmaps.gov.in
 https://chengalpattu.nic.in

Special Economic Zones of India
Villages in Kanchipuram district